Babitzin is a surname. Notable people with the surname include:

 Kirill "Kirka" Babitzin (1950–2007), Finnish singer
 Marija "Muska" Babitzin (born 1952), Finnish singer
 Sammy Babitzin (1948–1973), Finnish singer, brother of Kirka and Muska